Albert Shevketovich Selimov (born 5 April 1986) is a Russian former amateur boxer of Lezgin descent. He is best known for being the only man to defeat Vasiliy Lomachenko in the amateur ranks. Competing for Russia he won the 2007 world title, the 2008 World Cup, and two European titles, in 2006 and 2010. After failing to qualify for the 2012 Olympics he moved to Azerbaijan and placed second at the 2015 World Championships and fifth at the 2016 Summer Olympics.

Career
At the 2006 European Championships he beat Stephen Smith in the semis and Shahin Imranov 28:10 in the final.

At the 2007 World Championships southpaw counterpuncher Selimov beat American southpaw Raynell Williams and won against Yakup Kılıç by walk-over to reach the finals. There he outlasted Ukrainian Vasiliy Lomachenko, another southpaw.

In the round one bout of the featherweight division at the 2008 Beijing Olympics Vasiliy Lomachenko got his revenge and outclassed Selimov 16–11, cutting short Selimov's dream for Olympic gold.
Selimov finished his amateur career with 253 fights under his belt, 236 wins, 17 losses.

Olympic Games
2008
Lost to Vasiliy Lomachenko (Ukraine) 7–14
2016
Defeated David Joyce (Ireland) 3-0
Lost to Sofiane Oumiha (France) 0-3

World Championships
2007 (featherweight)
Defeated Iulian Stan (Romania) RSC-1
Defeated Marcel Herfuth (Germany) PTS
Defeated Bahodirjon Sooltonov (Uzbekistan) 24–9
Defeated Raynell Williams (United States) 25–8
Defeated Yakup Kılıç (Turkey) walk-over
Defeated Vasiliy Lomachenko (Ukraine) 16–11

2009 (lightweight)
Defeated Mohammad Aziz (Afghanistan) 25–1
Defeated Erick Bonez (Ecuador) 18–0
Defeated Sailom Ardee (Thailand) 14–8
Defeated Éverton Lopes (Brazil) 17–2
Lost to José Pedraza (Puerto Rico) 5–9

2011 (lightweight)
Lost to Hector Manzanilla (Venezuela) DQ

2015 (lightweight)
Defeated Seán McComb (Ireland) 2–1
Defeated Sofiane Oumiha (France) 3–0
Defeated Robson Conceicao (Brazil) 3–0
Lost to Lazaro Alvarez (Cuba) TKO (cuts)

Boxing World Cup
2006 (featherweight)
Defeated Xie Longwang (China) 29–11
Defeated Dmytro Bulenkov (Ukraine) RSCO 2
Lost to Ibrahima Keita (Guinea) by walkover
Lost to Yuriolkis Gamboa (Cuba) RET 3

2008 (lightweight)
Defeated José Pedraza (Puerto Rico) 14–4
Defeated Hu Qing (China) 12–10

European Championships
2006 (featherweight)
Defeated Sandor Racz (Hungary) RSCO-2
Defeated Edgar Manukyan (Armenia) RSCO-2
Defeated Stephen Smith (England) RSCO-2
Defeated Shahin Imranov (Azerbaijan) 28–10

European Games
2015 (lightweight)
Defeated Otar Eranosyan (Georgia) 3–0
Defeated Elian Dimitrov (Bulgaria) 3–0
Defeated Seán McComb (Ireland) 3–0
Defeated Sofiane Oumiha (France) 3–0

References

External links

 
 
 
 

1986 births
Lezgins
Azerbaijani male boxers
Russian people of Lezgian descent
Living people
Boxers at the 2008 Summer Olympics
Olympic boxers of Russia
People from Kaspiysk
Russian male boxers
AIBA World Boxing Championships medalists
Boxers at the 2015 European Games
European Games gold medalists for Azerbaijan
European Games medalists in boxing
Boxers at the 2016 Summer Olympics
Olympic boxers of Azerbaijan
Naturalized citizens of Azerbaijan
Featherweight boxers
Sportspeople from Dagestan